Liu Min (劉旻) ( 895 – 954), named Liu Chong (劉崇) before 951,, also known Emperor Shizu of Northern Han by his temple name Shizu (世祖), was the founding emperor of the Northern Han state during the Five Dynasties and Ten Kingdoms period of imperial China. He was an ethnic Shatuo and the younger brother of Later Han's founder Liu Zhiyuan.

Liu Chong created Northern Han in the Shatuo base in modern Shanxi after his eldest son was killed in 951 by general Guo Wei, who overthrew Later Han to find the Later Zhou state. In 954, Liu Chong was defeated by Guo's successor Chai Rong in the Battle of Gaoping and died soon afterwards.

Early life
The young Liu Chong drank and gambled and was once sentenced to join the military with his face tattooed.

During Later Jin
When Liu Zhiyuan became the military governor of Hedong (河東; roughly modern Shanxi), he named Liu Chong his chief director (都指揮使).

Formation of the Northern Han

Liu Min was the brother of Liu Zhiyuan, the founder of the Later Han state, which was the last of three successive Shatuo Turk dynasties. The Later Han fell in 950 with the rise of the Later Zhou. Liu Min declared himself the legitimate successor of the Later Han and formed the Northern Han (sometimes called Eastern Han) kingdom in Shanxi, the traditional power base of the Shatuo Turks.

Relations with neighbouring states 
The kingdom was wedged between its two larger, more powerful neighbors, the Later Zhou to the south, and the Khitan Liao Dynasty to the north. Liu Min restored traditional ties with the Khitans, who served as protectors to the Northern Han Kingdom, allowing it to last later than any of the other kingdoms traditionally listed as one of the Ten Kingdoms.

Family 
 Father
 Liu Dian (劉琠), posthumously honored Emperor Zhangsheng with the temple name of Xianzu
 Mother
 Lady An, Lady Dowager of Wu, posthumously honored Empress Zhangyi
 Wife
 Empress (name unknown)
 Concubine
 Consort Wang (915-971)
 Children
 Liu Chengyun or Liu Yun, the Duke of Xiangyin (created 951, killed by Guo Wei 951)
 Liu Chengjun (Liu Jun) (劉承鈞), later Emperor Ruizong
 Liu Hao (劉鎬), killed by Liu Jiyuan ~968
 Liu Kai (劉鍇), killed by Liu Jiyuan ~968
 Liu Qi (劉錡), killed by Liu Jiyuan ~968
 Liu Xí (劉錫, note different tone than his brother), killed by Liu Jiyuan ~968
 Liu Xǐ (劉銑, note different tone than his brother)
 At least three more sons
 Princess, mother of Liu Ji'en and Liu Jiyuan

Notes

References

Citations

Sources 

 
 
 
 

|- style="text-align: center;"

|-

890s births
954 deaths
Year of birth uncertain
Northern Han emperors
10th-century Turkic people
Jin (Later Tang precursor) people born during Tang
Later Tang people
Later Jin (Five Dynasties) people
Later Han (Five Dynasties) jiedushi of Hedong Circuit
Later Zhou jiedushi of Hedong Circuit
People from North China
Founding monarchs
9th-century Turkic people